Hannah Rose Hodson (born September 10, 1991) is an American actress, journalist, and poet.  She played Shameika Wallace in the TNT television film The Ron Clark Story (2006), Camille Hawthorne on the TNT medical drama series Hawthorne (2009–2011), Becca in the science fiction film Campus Code (2015), and Lorna on the Showtime dark comedy series Happyish (2015).

Early life
Hodson was born in San Francisco, California, and her family moved to Brooklyn, New York, when she was 2 years old.

Career
Hodson got her start in a Nike Air Jordan commercial directed by Spike Lee, who later cast her in his short film "Jesus Children of America," which premiered at the Venice Film Festival in 2005. She also starred in the TNT film special The Ron Clark Story as Shameika, for which she won a Young Artist's Award in 2007. She played Camille Hawthorne, daughter of Jada Pinkett-Smith's character Christina, in the 2009 TNT television drama series Hawthorne.

Personal life
Hodson graduated from The Beacon School in 2009. In 2013, she graduated from Hampshire College, where she studied theater and black studies.

Filmography

Film

Television

References

External links

1991 births
Living people
American child actresses
American television actresses
African-American actresses
American film actresses
21st-century African-American people
21st-century African-American women